The Woman Who Dared (French title: Le Ciel est à vous) is a 1944 French drama film directed by Jean Grémillon and starring Madeleine Renaud and Charles Vanel. In April 2019, a restored version of the film was selected to be shown in the Cannes Classics section at the 2019 Cannes Film Festival.

Plot
The mechanic Pierre Gauthier runs his own garage until he gets disappropriated because his grounds are required for a new airport. Together with his wife Thérèse, their two children and his moody mother-in-law he has to move. Due to his friendly nature he renders all kinds of services to everybody who asks him for a favour. When he helps a businessman whose car has broken down in the middle of the night, he and his wife are offered a new job, managing an auto dealership and service business in another town. Thérèse takes the new job on a trial basis, leaving Pierre to care for their children. During her absence, Pierre, an ex WWI flyer, returns to his love for aviation and neglects his work and family. When Thérèse returns, there is conflict until eventually she too discovers the joy of aviation and learns to understand Pierre.  After they mutually struggle to follow their dream of aviation success, Thérèse decides to attempt to break a long-distance flight record, and succeeds.

Cast
 Madeleine Renaud – Thérèse Gauthier
 Charles Vanel – Pierre Gauthier
 Jean Debucourt – Larcher
 Raymonde Vernay – Madame Brissard
 Léonce Corne – Doctor Maulette
 Raoul Marco – Monsieur Noblet
 Albert Rémy – Marcel
 Robert Le Fort – Robert
 Anne-Marie Labaye – Jacqueline
 Michel François – Claude
 Gaston Mauger – the successor to Doctor Maulette
 Paul Demange – Petit ("Little")
 Henry Houry – a member of the administration council
 Anne Vandène – Lucienne Ivry

References

Bibliography
 Higbee, Will & Leahy, Sarah. Studies in French Cinema: UK Perspectives, 1985–2010. Intellect Books, 2011.

External links

1944 films
1940s French-language films
French black-and-white films
Films directed by Jean Grémillon
French drama films
French aviation films
1944 drama films
1940s French films